Jackson Township is an inactive township in Clark County, in the U.S. state of Missouri.

History
Jackson Township has the name of President Andrew Jackson.

References

Townships in Missouri
Townships in Clark County, Missouri